Villa Fátima is a town and corregimiento located in the Vaupés Department, Republic of Colombia.

Corregimientos of Vaupés Department